The LB Nagar Metro Station is located on the Red Line of the Hyderabad Metro. It is part of Corridor I of Hyderabad metro starting from Miyapur and was opened to public on 24 September 2018. Five shuttle bus services from L.B. Nagar Metro Station will carry tourists to Ramoji Film City every day. Passengers can visit all miles app or LB Nagar station for more details. This metro station is recording one of the highest footfalls daily. 

The catchment areas of LB Nagar Metro station are major residential hubs of Hayathnagar, Vanasthalipuram, and BN Reddy Nagar to Mansoorabad. In October 2022, LB Nagar metro station was awarded Indian Green Building Council (IGBC) Green MRTS Certification with the highest platinum rating under elevated stations category.

References

Hyderabad Metro stations